Mark Schmocker (born May 17, 1966) is an American handball player. He competed in the men's tournament at the 1996 Summer Olympics.

References

External links
 

1966 births
Living people
American male handball players
Olympic handball players of the United States
Handball players at the 1996 Summer Olympics
People from Interlaken